The Apostolic Prefecture of Jian'ou is an apostolic prefecture located in the city of Jian'ou that is immediately subject to the Holy See. On 8 January 1938, the Apostolic Vicariate of Jian'ou was established and placed under the care of the Dominican Order. In 1950, there were around 1450 faithful in the jurisdiction.

Leadership
 Archbishop Peter Lin Jia-shan (2004–present) as prefect apostolic
 Paolo Adamo Curran, O.P. (1948-1953)
 Michele Agostino O’Connor, O.P. (1938-1941)
 Guglielmo Ferrer Cassidy, O.P. (1937-1938)

References
 GCatholic
 Catholic Hierarchy

Roman Catholic dioceses in China
Christian organizations established in 1938
Roman Catholic dioceses and prelatures established in the 20th century
Christianity in Fujian
Nanping